In mathematics, the Artin approximation theorem is a fundamental result of  in deformation theory which implies that formal power series with coefficients in a field k are well-approximated by the algebraic functions on k.

More precisely, Artin proved two such theorems: one, in 1968, on approximation of complex analytic solutions by formal solutions (in the case ); and an algebraic version of this theorem in 1969.

Statement of the theorem
Let  denote a collection of n indeterminates,   the ring of formal power series with indeterminates  over a field k, and  a different set of indeterminates. Let 

Then given a formal power series solution , there is an algebraic solution  consisting of algebraic functions (more precisely, algebraic power series) such that

Discussion
Given any desired positive integer c, this theorem shows that one can find an algebraic solution approximating a formal power series solution up to the degree specified by c. This leads to theorems that deduce the existence of certain formal moduli spaces of deformations as schemes. See also: Artin's criterion.

Alternative statement

be a functor sending filtered colimits to filtered colimits (Artin calls such a functor locally of finite presentation).  Then for any integer c and any , there is a  such that 

.

See also 
Ring with the approximation property
Popescu's theorem
Artin's criterion

References

Moduli theory
Commutative algebra
Theorems about algebras